Namika (given name, Hanan Hamdi), also known by the stage name Hän Violett, is a German singer and rapper.

Biography 
Namika grew up in Frankfurt. Her grandparents are Berber Moroccan, from the coastal city of Nador.

She released her debut album, Nador, on 21 July 2015. The album includes her first single, 'Lieblingsmensch'. By the end of July 2015 the album had reached number thirteen in the German album charts. The single Lieblingsmensch debuted at number twenty-seven in the German single charts and climbed to number one after eight weeks.

Namika has published seven music videos, including the song Na-Mi-Ka, which is from her EP Hellwach. Namika entered a specially edited version of her song Hellwach in the Bundesvision Song Contest 2015. The track was produced by the German producer team Beatgees, who has also produced for Lena, Curse, and Ann Sophie. She represented the State of Hessen. By the end of the competition on 29 August 2015 the song had reached seventh place. Recently in 2018 she performed ' Je ne parle pas français' whose remix was featuring Black M. The song reached number one in the German charts. On 1 July, she released her second studio album "Que Walou".

Namika performed three songs as a competitor in the 2015 New Music Award competition.

Discography

Albums

Extended plays

Singles

Other releases
 2013: Flow zum Gesang (as Hän Violett)
 2015: Nador
 2015: Wenn sie kommen (feat. Ali As)
 2015: Na-Mi-Ka
 2015: Mein Film (feat. MoTrip)
 2016: Zauberland
 2018: Ahmed (1960–2002)
 2018: Que Walou
 2018: Ich will dich vermissen
 2018: Zirkus
 2018  Phantom

As featured artist

Awards 
 1Live Krone 2015: Nominated for Best Female Artist

References

External links 

 Namika's Website

 Namika at laut.de
 Namika at JIVE (Label from Sony Music Entertainment)
 «Als Kind war ich traurig, keine richtige Deutsche zu sein»
 Article about Namika in Die Welt
 Namika on YouTube

Contemporary R&B singers
German women musicians
German rappers
1991 births
Musicians from Frankfurt
Participants in the Bundesvision Song Contest
German women rappers
German women singers
Living people
German people of Moroccan descent
German people of Berber descent
German people of Riffian descent